The population of Budapest was 1,735,041 on 1 January 2013. According to the 2011 census, the Budapest metropolitan area was home to 2,530,167 people and the Budapest commuter area (real periphery of the city) had 3.3 million inhabitants. The Hungarian capital is the largest in the Pannonian Basin and the ninth largest in the European Union. Budapest is also the primate city of Hungary and some neighbouring territories.

Population growth 

The Capital city of Budapest was established on 17 November 1873 with the unification of three separate towns, named Buda, Óbuda and Pest. In 1720 Buda and Óbuda had 9,600 residents, while Pest was a small town with only 2,600 inhabitants. In the 18th and 19th century Pest became the natural commercial, transportation, industrial and cultural center of Hungary, Buda and Óbuda remained small towns. The population of Pest reached 50,000 in the 1820s, 100,000 in the 1840s and 200,000 in the 1860s. At the time of the unification Buda and Óbuda had 69,543 inhabitants, Pest was home to 227,294 people. The first modern Hungarian census was held in 1869–70, when the Hungarian Central Statistical Office enumerated 302,085 people at the present-territory of Budapest. Between the unification and the World War I Greater Budapest quadrupled its population, got a new global city upon the Danube. At that time Budapest was one of the fastest-growing cities in Europe, triggered by industrialisation and high natural growth rate and fertility of rural ethnic Hungarians. Internal migration peaked in the 1960s with near 250,000 people in correlate to post World War II baby boom and forced collectivization. The city became extremely overcrowded, the central government also perceived the problem and limited getting apartment in 1965, preventing overcrowding, housing shortage and the collapse of public works. This restriction raised a strong wave of suburbanization, which peaked after fall of the Communism, the number of inhabitants dropped to 1.7 million, while garden housing development is still decisive in the suburbs. Reurbanisation and gentrification getting on since the mid-2000s.

Ethnicity 

After the conquest of the Carpathian Basin one of the main Hungarian (Magyar) tribes, named Megyer, settled in the present-territory of Budapest, more exactly on both banks of the river Danube in Békásmegyer („Frog’s Megyer”) and Káposztásmegyer („Cabbage’s Megyer”), now high-rise housing estates of the city. Endonym „Magyar” (for Hungarians) is originated from the tribe name „Megyer”. According to the 1494-95 medieval census, was implemented by the Hungarian Royal Treasury, the present-territory of Budapest had Hungarian majority. The native population fled from the area during the Ottoman wartimes, in the 17th century Buda was home to mainly Turkish and South Slavic population. Many of them died in the Battle of Buda in 1686, survivors were expelled. In the late-17th and the early-18th century Buda, Óbuda and Pest was settled by Germans from Southern Germany and the Rhineland. The proportion of Hungarians rose gradually since the late 18th century, overtook Germans around the unification in 1873. Between 1787 and 1910 number of ethnic Hungarians rose from 2.3 million to 10.2 million due to population explosion, generated by the resettlement of the Great Hungarian Plain and Lower Hungary by Hungarian settlers from the relatively overpopulated northern and western counties of the Kingdom of Hungary. Hungarian villages and market towns become overcrowded, Budapest has become the main destination of the rural surplus population due to industrialisation. Hungarians increased their number from 200,000 to 2,000,000 in Budapest between 1880 and 1980. By the end of the World War II, Budapest can be described as an ethnically homogeneous city.

According to the 2011 census the total population of Budapest was 1,729,040, of whom there were 1,397,851 (80.8%) Hungarians, 19,530 (1.1%) Romani, 18,278 (1.0%) Germans, 6,189 (0.4%) Romanians, 4,692 (0.3%) Chinese and 2,581 (0.1%) Slovaks. 301,943 people (17.5%) did not declare their ethnicity. Excluding these people Hungarians made up 98.0% of the total population. In Hungary people can declare more than one ethnicity, so the sum of ethnicities is higher than the total population.

Languages 

According to the 2011 census, 1,712,153 people (99.0%) speak Hungarian, of whom 1,692,815 people (97.9%) speak it as a first language, while 19,338 people (1.1%) speak it as a second language. Other spoken (foreign) languages were: English (536,855 speaker, 31.0%), German (266,249 speaker, 15.4%), French (56,208 speaker, 3.3%) and Russian (54,613 speaker, 3.2%).

Religion 

Budapest is the home to one of the most populous Christian community in Central Europe, numbered 698,521 people (40.4%) in 2011. The Hungarian capital is also the home of the largest Calvinist community on Earth. Hungarian Calvinists increased their number from 13,008 (4.8%) to 224,169 (12.6%) between 1870 and 2001 due to internal migration, triggered by higher fertility than other denominations.  However the 2011 census showed decline in all religious groups - the number of Calvinists fell to 146,756 people (8.5%). Hungarian Roman Catholics remained the most populous separate group with 501,117 people (28.9%). Moreover, the most recent census was the first one in the city's history when the share of people attached to religious groups was below 50%.

Judaism also was a significant religion in Budapest, numbered 215,512 people (23.2%) in 1920, but they dropped to a smaller group (80,000 people, 4.2% in 2018) due to the Holocaust, secularization, and atheism, the huge ratio to convert to Christianity, and assimilation and intermarriages with non-Jews after 1945, and the immigration to Israel. Religious Hungarian Jews has had the lowest fertility in Hungary, natural decline began in the 1920s. The community is still very aged with 52.6 years median age, about ten years higher than Catholics (41.7 years) and Calvinists (42.5 years).

Migration and citizenship 
According to the 2001 census, majority of the population of Budapest is originated from the Hungarian countryside. 230,307 people (13%) are from the Great Plain, 170,406 (9.6%) from Transdanubia, 93,665 (5.3%) from Pest county and 90,228 people (5.1%) are from Northern Hungary. Budapest is the hometown to 822,663 people (46.3%), while 87,746 people (4.9%) was born outside the present-day borders of Hungary. (See: Treaty of Trianon and Treaty of Paris)

In 2001, 1,736,521 (97.7%) Hungarian citizens, 6,507 (~0.4%) Hungarian and others and 34,824 (~2%) foreigners lived in Budapest. Ethnic Hungarians made up the majority of non-Hungarian citizens also, primary from Romania, former Yugoslavia and Ukraine. They have come to Hungary due to better possibility of employment.

According to the 2011 census, 1,600,585 people (92.6%) were born in Hungary, 126,036 people (7.3%) outside Hungary while the birthplace of 2,419 people (0.1%) was unknown.

Politics and demography 

According to the 2010 and 2014 local and national elections, the largest party of Budapest is the ruling national conservative alliance of Hungary, Fidesz-KDNP, headed by prime minister Viktor Orbán. Fidesz is followed by the centre-left Unity, the far right Jobbik and the green liberal LMP.

The spatial distribution of political parties is very various. Fidesz is outstanding in the conservative middle and upper middle class (high income) characteristic Buda (parts of the 1st, 2nd, 3rd, 11th and 12th districts) and in the garden estates (former suburbs, annexed by the city) of Pest (parts of the 14th, 15th, 16th and 17th districts). Unity and Jobbik are relatively strong in the working class and lower middle class characteristic neighbourhoods (parts of the 4th, 10th, 13th, 14th, 15th, 18th, 19th, 20th and 21st districts) while LMP is remarkable in the partly run-down, inner (more liberal) blocks (parts of 6th, 7th, 8th and 9th districts).

In the Parliamentary elections of 2014, national conservative Fidesz-KDNP won 10 and the centre-left Unity won 8 from the 18 electoral districts of Budapest.

See also 

 Demographics of Hungary
 Budapest
 Greater Budapest
 Budapest metropolitan area

References 
Gábor Preisich: Budapest városépítésének története, Műszaki Könyvkiadó, Budapest, 1998,